The 2023 season will be the Houston Texans' upcoming 22nd season in the National Football League and the first under head coach DeMeco Ryans. They will attempt to improve on their 3-13-1 record from last year, make the playoffs for the first time since 2019, and end their three-year AFC South title drought.

Offseason
The Texans fired Lovie Smith after a season as the head coach with a record of 3–13–1. On January 31, 2023 the Texans hired former player DeMeco Ryans as their new head coach, Ryans was spent previous two seasons with 49ers defensive coordinator.

Draft

Staff

Current roster

Preseason
The Texans' preseason opponents and schedule will be announced in the spring.

Regular season

2023 opponents
Listed below are the Texans' opponents for 2023. Exact dates and times will be announced in the spring.

References

External links
 

Houston
Houston Texans seasons
Houston Texans